Amerigo Paradiso (born March 22, 1962) is a retired Italian professional football player.

1962 births
Living people
Footballers from Milan
Italian footballers
Serie A players
Serie B players
Inter Milan players
Calcio Foggia 1920 players
A.C. Reggiana 1919 players
Ternana Calcio players
A.C.N. Siena 1904 players
S.P.A.L. players
A.S. Sambenedettese players
U.S. Avellino 1912 players
U.S. Sassuolo Calcio players
S.S.D. Sanremese Calcio players
Virtus Bergamo Alzano Seriate 1909 players
Association football forwards